The Miss Hong Kong Pageant 2018 (2018香港小姐競選) was the 46th Miss Hong Kong pageant held in TVB City, Hong Kong on 26 August 2018. 20 delegates competed for this title.   

2017 Miss Hong Kong winner Juliette Louie crowned her successor Hera Chan. Winner Hera Chan went go on to represent Hong Kong at the 2019 Miss Chinese International Pageant and won.

Results

Placements

Special Awards
These awards were given during the telecast of the pageant on August 26:
Miss Photogenic: Amber Tang (鄧卓殷)
Miss Friendship: Claudia Chan (陳靜堯)

The following awards were given during sponsor or promotion event.
Sasa Beauty Award: Hera Chan (陳曉華)
Sasa Talent Award: Sara Ting (丁子田) and Claudia Chan (陳靜堯)
Luk Fook Jewellery Award: Grace Lan (蘭倚婷)
Miss Best Talent: Krystl Kung (鞏姿希)

Delegates
The Miss Hong Kong 2018 delegates were:

Elimination chart

Judges

Miss Photogenic Judges:
 Grace Chan, Miss Chinese International 2014; Miss Hong Kong 2013
 Selena Li, Miss Hong Kong Pageant 2003 Miss Photogenic
 Kristal Tin (田蕊妮)
 Lai Lok-yi (黎諾懿)

Post-Pageant Notes
 Hera Chan was crowned Miss Chinese International 2019 in Hong Kong.

References

External links 
 Official Website

Miss Hong Kong Pageants
2018 in Hong Kong
Hong Kong